The Kaaimans River, also known as Keerom River, is a river in the Western Cape, South Africa. The mouth of the river lies near Wilderness. Further upriver, the Kaaimans River Gorge is popular for hiking and whitewater kayaking.

The nearest large towns are Mossel Bay and George.

History

The Kaaimans River was formerly an obstacle for travellers, whose wagons had to wait sometimes for weeks before being able to cross it safely when it ran full of water. It was also nicknamed "Keeromrivier" (Turnabout River) because, faced with the raging waters, some travellers had to turn and try to find another way to reach their destination. Finally this obstacle was overcome when the Seven Passes Road was built by Thomas Charles John Bain.

The tidal estuary at its mouth is crossed by a rail bridge. The Outeniqua Choo Tjoe, the last passenger steam train in Africa, crossed this bridge until the line was closed due to landslides in 2006.

Gallery

See also 
 List of rivers of South Africa
 Kaaimans Rivier Pass

References

External links

Wilderness’s Kaaimans river rescue
Southern African Mountain Passes - Kaaimans River Pass
Kaaimans River - Accommodation

Rivers of the Western Cape